Kwee or KWEE may refer to:

 4646 Kwee, a main-belt asteroid, named after astronomer Kiem King Kwee (b. 1927)
 59P/Kearns–Kwee, a periodic comet
 KWEE, a radio station (100.1 FM) licensed to Dayton, Nevada
 KKWA, a radio station (96.3 FM) licensed to West Linn, Oregon, United States, which held the call sign KWEE from 2016 to 2019
 An alternate Romanization of the surname Guo

People
 The Kwee family of Ciledug, a historic family of the 'Cabang Atas' or the Chinese gentry of colonial Indonesia'
 The Kwee family of Pontiac Land Group, a later, contemporary Singaporean business family of Chinese-Indonesian descent
 Kwee Tek Hoay (1886–1951) was a Chinese Indonesian Malay-language writer
 Kwee Wee, ring name of American wrestler Allan Eric Funk (born 1971)
 Derre Kwee (born 1994), a Dutch footballer
 Giam Choo Kwee (born 1942), a Singapore chess International Master
 Lo Kwee-seong (1910–1995), a Hong Kong businessman and philanthropist
Kwee Phyo (U Phyo Min Thein), a Burmese politician and former political prisoner who is currently serving as Chief Minister of Yangon Region.